Sacha Pecaric (born 1965 in Rijeka) is a Croatian-born rabbi.

Education and scholarship
After studies in Prague, Pecaric continued to study at the rabbinic department of the Yeshiva University in New York City, where he obtained rabbinical ordination, and the Department of Philosophy of Columbia University (M.A.) and FAMU in Prague (Ph.D.). He lived in Kraków where he ran the Ronald S. Lauder Foundation, aimed at providing education to the small local Jewish community as well as other local people, and where he set up Pardes Lauder, a Jewish religious publishing house which has published more than 30 books, including a prayer book and Haggada for Passover.

Pecaric was the author of the first translation of the Torah from Hebrew to Polish to be done by a Jew since the Second World War. His translation, made independently of existing Polish translations, includes – Bereshit (Genesis, 2001), Shemot (Exodus, 2003), Vajikra (Leviticus, 2005) and Bemidbar (Numbers, 2005) and Devarim (Deuteronomium, 2006).

References

External links 
 Pardes (in Polish)

1965 births
People from Rijeka
Living people
Rabbis from Kraków
20th-century Croatian rabbis
Modern Orthodox rabbis
Polish Orthodox rabbis
Translators of the Bible into Polish
Yugoslav emigrants to the United States
Yugoslav expatriates in Czechoslovakia
American emigrants to Poland
Jewish translators of the Bible